The  is an umbrella group of which most Hokkaidō Ainu and some other Ainu are members.  Originally controlled by the government with the intention of speeding Ainu assimilation and integration into the Japanese nation state, it now operates independently of the government and is run exclusively by Ainu.

It was established in 1930 under the name . Since 1961 utari has been used instead of "Ainu". The group has been influential in raising public awareness of Ainu issues. The organization's name was changed back to Hokkaido Ainu Association in early 2009.  From 1964 to 1996, its executive director was Giichi Nomura.

See also
Ainu flag

Notes

External links
Hokkaido Utari Association

Ainu politics
Indigenous rights organizations in Asia
Cultural organizations based in Japan
Ainu organizations
Organizations established in 1930
1930 establishments in Japan